Douglas Raymond Clifford (born April 24, 1945) is an American drummer, best known as a founding member of Credence Clearwater Revival for which he was inducted into the Rock and Roll Hall of Fame in 1993. After the group disbanded in late 1972, Clifford released a solo album and later joined CCR bassist Stu Cook in the Don Harrison Band. In 1995, Clifford and Cook formed the band Creedence Clearwater Revisited, performing live versions of Creedence Clearwater Revival songs.

An early influence on Clifford's playing was The Beatles, with their appearance on The Ed Sullivan Show in February 1964 being of particular significance. "They were a quartet and we said, wow, we can do that. If these guys from England can come out and play rock 'n' roll, we can do it. We bought Beatle wigs. We went to the drama store, and I guess they were Three Stooges wigs at that time." Clifford, along with Cook and the Fogerty brothers grew up together in El Cerrito, California.

Discography

Cosmo (1972)
Magic Window (2020)

The Don Harrison Band
The Don Harrison Band (1976)
Red Hot (1977)

Creedence Clearwater Revisited
Recollection (1998)

Clifford/Wright
For All The Money In The World (2021)

Other

References

External links
 Classicdrummer.com
 Rockabilly.nl
 Creedence-revisited.com
 
 

1945 births
Living people
American rock drummers
Creedence Clearwater Revisited members
Creedence Clearwater Revival members
Musicians from Palo Alto, California
20th-century American drummers
American male drummers